R. vinacea may refer to:

 Ropica vinacea, a species of beetle
 Roseomonas vinacea, a species of Gram negative bacteria